Montavilla (a syllabic abbreviation of "Mt. Tabor Village) is a neighborhood in the Northeast and Southeast sections of Portland, Oregon, United States, and contains an area east of Mount Tabor and west of Interstate 205, from the Banfield to SE Division. It is bordered by North Tabor, Mount Tabor, Madison South, Hazelwood, and Powellhurst-Gilbert.

History 
The neighborhood was originally, in the 1890s, named Mount Tabor Village, and was a stopping point for travelers going from Hood River into Portland. 
The name "Montavilla" originated from the abbreviations used on the streetcar destination signs when streetcars served the area starting in 1892. The name was first abbreviated as "Mt. Ta. Villa", then later as "Monta.Villa".  Residents soon adopted the latter name for the neighborhood, written as Montavilla.  Streetcar service to Montavilla ended in 1948.

A stone milepost marker, the P5 marker, on SE Stark Street at 78th Avenue is left over from the circa 1854 Base Line Road that extended from the Sandy River to the Willamette River. The milepost marks a distance of five miles to the downtown courthouse. It is among the markers that indicate the Willamette baseline.

In the early-mid 1950s, the Asbahr Addition was developed between SE 89th and SE 92nd Avenues to the west and east, and SE Taylor and SE Harrison Streets to the north and south. It is primarily made of ranch-style houses.

Chinese Village, a longtime neighborhood landmark, was demolished in July 2018; it was located on 82nd Avenue between SE Washington and Stark Streets.

The Monastery of the Precious Blood, a 1923 building on the National Register of Historic Places, is on 76th Avenue.

History of Housing Planning in Montavilla 
A 1934 redlining map of Portland assigned the areas within current Montavilla boundaries with a yellow grade, or "Definitely Declining." Regarding the C30 tract surrounding the Stark Street business district, mapmakers reported, "The area is not highly regarded and considerable sales resistance is reported," while also noting "subversive races a threat."

In 1947, a racist covenant placed restrictions on the Park Terrace Homes development (along NE Pacific Street between 82nd and 87th Avenues), declaring, "No race or nationality other than those of the Caucasian or White race shall occupy any dwelling on any lot except this Covenant shall not prevent occupancy by domestic servants of a different race or nationality employed by an owner or tenant.”

Community 
Founded in 2010, the Montavilla Food Co-op is working to bring a cooperative grocery to the neighborhood, though it currently does not have a storefront. Montavilla is home to the community organization Pollinator Parkways, which converts parking strips to wildlife habitat. Montavilla Street Fair is held each summer, bringing community members and local businesses together on the Stark strip. The Montavilla Emergency Warming Shelter and Rahab's Sisters both operate from St. Peter and Paul Church, located on SE 82nd Avenue. The neighborhood was served by the local Mid-County Memo newspaper until 2019. The Montavilla Farmers Market is held on Sundays at 77th and Stark. The southern portion of the neighborhood includes the Jade District commercial and cultural center.

Parks 
Montavilla is home to Montavilla Park, a 9.46 acre park established in 1921. It includes a Portland Timbers-sponsored futsal field, dedicated in August 2014. Montavilla also includes Berrydale Park, Harrison Park, and Montavilla Community Center. Vestal Community Garden is located near Vestal school.

In event of a major earthquake, such as a Cascadia Subduction Zone earthquake, Montavilla Park will serve as a Basic Earthquake Emergency Communication Nodes Site, one of the city's official locations for seeking emergency assistance if phone service is down or for reporting severe damage or injury. Montavilla Park is located at the intersection of Glisan Street and 82nd Avenue.

Schools 
Vestal K-5, a school for social justice, is located near the center of the neighborhood, immediately west of 82nd Avenue between E Burnside Street and NE Glisan Street. Creative Science School, (Formerly a branch of Clark Elementary School) is a K-8 focus school located immediately west of 92nd Avenue and north of SE Hawthorne Boulevard.
Harrison Park School K-8 is located near the southern end of the neighborhood on SE 87th Avenue between Harrison Park and SE Division Street in the Jade District.

Montavilla also includes higher education institutions. Multnomah University, a nondenominational Christian university, is located north of Glisan Street adjacent to Montavilla Park. Portland Community College Southeast campus is located at the southwest boundary of the neighborhood at 82nd Avenue and Division Street.

Stark Street 
As a neighborhood center, SE Stark Street between 75th and 82nd Avenues provides a mix of commercial and retail services to residents and visitors. It is a place where people can socialize, run their errands, window shop, and dine at local restaurants. At the center of the area is the Academy Theater, built in 1948 and restored in 2006. some local shops include Bipartisan Cafe, Hungry Heart Bakery, Lazy Susan, Union Rose, and even more local and nonlocal shops on the center of the Montavilla Neighborhood!

Glisan Street 
While Glisan Street is more vehicle-oriented than Stark Street, the area west of 82nd Avenue has a number of pedestrian-friendly small business, including a number of eateries, that serve residents and visitors. In 2020, the Rocket Empire Machine food hall (similar to the Ocean and the Zipper, both in Kerns) opened on Glisan near 70th. Longtime eateries include East Glisan Pizza Lounge, Bui's Natural Tofu, The House of Bahn Mi, Hanoi Kitchen, Chicken Little Fried Chicken, Fressen Artisan Bakery and Cafe, Blank Slate, Mudd Works Roastery, Citrine Bloom, Mother Lovin Coffee, DB Deserts, a Black family owned business and catering company, White Pepper (they only cater) and Montavilla Saloon. The street also hosts dispensaries, medical offices, gift stores, salons, auto shops, and religious institutions.

Transportation 
Three roads bounding Montavilla—Division, I-84, and I-205—are major transportation arteries, giving the neighborhood easy automobile access to the city center and outlying areas. Within Montavilla, Glisan, Burnside, and Stark Streets run east–west and 82nd Avenue runs north–south; all are major transportation streets served by TriMet bus lines. The Max serves one stop in Montavilla, at 82nd Avenue, and another at the Gateway Transit Center, just outside the boundary. The neighborhood is the future home to the Seventies Neighborhood Greenway, which will address a gap in north-south bicycle and pedestrian facilities near NE 82nd Avenue. Current greenways run north–south approximately on 86th Avenue and east–west along Mill Street.

82nd Avenue 
The thoroughfare 82nd Avenue (a formerly state-managed highway OR 213), bisects the neighborhood from north to south. It is a highly commercial street that is directly surrounded by dense neighborhoods of primarily single-family homes. Because 82nd Avenue runs through the neighborhood, residents often cross this five-lane road for school, work, or recreation. The intersection of 82nd and Glisan Street is among the city's identified high-crash intersections, and it is ranked by the City of Portland as the most dangerous intersection within Portland for pedestrians, however no public plans have been announced to improve this intersection. The intersections with SE Division and E Burnside are also identified as high-crash intersections. In an attempt to improve the quality of life around 82nd Avenue, the 82nd Avenue Improvement Coalition was formed; among its main goals is the transfer of ownership of 82nd Avenue to City of Portland control, instead of state control. In the spring of 2022, the Portland City Council approved the Portland Bureau of Transportation (PBOT) taking ownership of 82nd Avenue from the Oregon Department of Transportation (ODOT).

References

External links
 
 Guide to Montavilla Neighborhood (PortlandNeighborhood.com)
 Montavilla Neighborhood Association
 Montavilla East Tabor Business Association
Montavilla Street Tree Inventory
History of Racist Planning in Portland

 
Neighborhoods in Portland, Oregon
Northeast Portland, Oregon
Southeast Portland, Oregon